Derek J. Bailey (1972 – September 8, 2021) served as Tribal Chairman of the Grand Traverse Band of Ottawa and Chippewa Indians (GTB) beginning in 2008.  He also served prior on Tribal Council from 2004 to 2008.  On October 1, 2011, Bailey announced his candidacy for the U.S. House of Representatives in Michigan's 1st congressional district.  During April 2012, Bailey ended his Congressional campaign effort and moved into Michigan's State House race for the 101st District (Leelanau, Benzie, Manistee and Mason counties). On May 11, 2015, he was arrested on child molestation charges. Bailey was sentenced to 25 to 50 years after being found guilty in Grand Traverse County of two counts of first degree criminal sexual conduct in April 2016. He was also sentenced to ten to 15 years after being found guilty in Leelanau County of two counts of second degree criminal sexual conduct in November 2015. Bailey was to serve his sentence concurrently. Bailey had a credit of 360 days.

Early life and education
Bailey was a native of Traverse City, Michigan, and grew up there and in neighboring Leelanau County. He earned a bachelor's degree in psychology in 1995 and a master's degree in social work in 1998, both from Grand Valley State University.

Career

Tribal service
Bailey began serving as the fifth GTB Tribal Chairman in November 2008. Bailey received a Presidential Appointment by President Obama to the National Advisory Council on Indian Education, and was sworn in on November 3, 2010. He resigned from the tribal council in July 2015.

Congressional campaign
On October 1, 2011, Bailey announced his intention to run for U.S. Representative for Michigan's newly redrawn 1st congressional district.  He was to run as a Democrat in the primary against Gary McDowell, a state representative who lost in the general election in 2010 against first-time candidate Dan Benishek.  In April 2012 he changed plans and instead decided to run for the state house of Representatives.  Bailey was narrowly defeated in the primary by Bernard "Allen" O'Shea.

Personal life
In 2012, he was married and lived in Benzie County. Also according to an article in 2012, Bailey has two sons and two step-daughters.

Legal issues
In May 2015, Bailey was charged with multiple counts of child molestation in Leelanau County. In August 2015, he was charged with more sex offenses in Grand Traverse County.
Bailey was sentenced to 25 to 50 years after being found guilty in Grand Traverse County of two counts of first degree criminal sexual conduct in April 2016. He was also sentenced to ten to 15 years after being found guilty in Leelanau County of two counts of second degree criminal sexual conduct in November 2015. Bailey was to serve his sentence concurrently. Bailey had a credit of 360 days.

Death
On September 2, 2021, Bailey was found unresponsive in his prison cell and later pronounced dead on September 8, 2021. He is believed to have succumbed  to a cardiac issue. He was 48.

References

External links
 Grand Traverse Band biography
 Tribal chairman Bailey to run for Congress
 Official campaign website

Grand Traverse Band of Ottawa and Chippewa Indians politicians
Michigan Democrats
Grand Valley State University alumni
1972 births
2021 deaths
Michigan politicians convicted of crimes
American politicians convicted of sex offences
People from Traverse City, Michigan
Place of death missing
People from Leelanau County, Michigan
Prisoners and detainees of Michigan
People from Benzie County, Michigan
Native American people from Michigan